Arturo Daudén Ibáñez (born 9 July 1964 in Cantavieja) is a retired Spanish professional football referee. He was a full international for FIFA from 1997 until his retirement in 2005.

References

External links 
 
 
 
 

1964 births
Living people
Spanish football referees
Sportspeople from the Province of Teruel